Matthew Ebden and Ryan Harrison were the defending champions, but Ebden decided not to participate.  Harrison played alongside his brother Christian Harrison, but lost in the first round to Ivan Dodig and Marcelo Melo.
Édouard Roger-Vasselin and Igor Sijsling won the title, defeating Colin Fleming and Jonathan Marray in the final, 7–6(8–6), 6–3.

Seeds

Draw

Draw

References
 Main Draw

BBandT Atlanta Open - Doubles
2013 Doubles